James L. Roberts Jr. (born c. 1940) is a former justice of the Supreme Court of Mississippi from 1983 to 1992.

He was born in Greenwood, Mississippi, and grew up in Greenville, Mississippi,. He received a Bachelor of Arts degree from the University of Mississippi in 1962 and a law degree from Harvard Law School in 1965.
 
He wrote Heroes, Rascals, and the Law. He taught at the University of Mississippi. He was appointed to the state supreme court by Mississippi governor William Winter.

References

Justices of the Mississippi Supreme Court
20th-century American judges
People from Greenwood, Mississippi
People from Greenville, Mississippi
University of Mississippi alumni
Harvard Law School alumni
University of Mississippi faculty
American legal writers
20th-century American male writers
20th-century American non-fiction writers
American male non-fiction writers